Jordan Lynn Horston (born May 21, 2001) is an American basketball player for the Tennessee Lady Volunteers of the Southeastern Conference.

High school career 
Horston attended Columbus Africentric High School in Ohio, where she played four varsity seasons. 

As a high school senior, she helped her team win their second straight state title, despite suffering from a  fever the previous night. Despite having an off shooting night (3-for-20 from the field), she put up 10 rebounds and 6 assists and wore a surgical mask when on the bench to contain her cough.

The no. 2 overall prospect and the top guard in the country, Horston committed to playing college basketball at Tennessee. She was also a participant in the McDonald's All-American Game, where she put up 14 points and was named the game's MVP.

College career

Freshman season 
Initially committing Tennessee to play for Holly Warlick, Horston learned of Warlick's firing while at the McDonald's All-American Game. Playing for Kellie Harper, she was named to the SEC All Academic team and SEC All-Freshman Team after averaging 10.1 points and 4.6 assists per game, leading the Lady Volunteers in assists and steals. She had the game-winner against Auburn on March 1, hitting a running with 0.6 seconds remaining.

National team career 
Horston represented the United States at the FIBA U17 Women's World Cup and FIBA Americas U16 Women's Championship, winning the most valuable player award at the World Cup.

Career statistics

College 

|-
| style="text-align:left;" | 2019–20
| style="text-align:left;" | Tennessee
| 31 || 22 || 26.4 || .394 || .300 || .593 || 5.5 || 4.6 || 1.3 || 0.8 || 4.3 || 10.1
|-
| style="text-align:left;" | 2020–21
| style="text-align:left;" | Tennessee
| 25 || 13 || 27.0 || .350 || .280 || .729 || 3.9 || 4.2 || 1.4 || 0.9 || 2.7 || 8.6
|-
| style="text-align:center;" colspan=2 | Career 
| 56 || 35 || 26.7 || .376 || .293 || .657 || 4.8 || 4.4 || 1.3 || 0.9 || 3.6 || 9.4

Personal life 
Horston is the daughter of Leigh and Malika Horston and has one sister. She is an advocate for mental health.

References

External links 
 
 
 Tennessee Lady Volunteers profile
 USA Basketball profile

2001 births
Living people
Basketball players from Dallas
Basketball players from Columbus, Ohio
Point guards
Shooting guards
Tennessee Lady Volunteers basketball players